Progress M-38 was a Russian unmanned Progress cargo spacecraft, which was launched in March 1998 to resupply the Mir space station.

Launch
Progress M-38 launched on 14 March 1998 from the Baikonur Cosmodrome in Kazakhstan. It used a Soyuz-U rocket.

Docking
Progress M-38 docked with the aft port of the Kvant-1 module of Mir on 17 March 1998 at 00:31:17 UTC, and was undocked on 15 May 1998 at 18:43:54 UTC.

Decay
It remained in orbit until 15 May 1998, when it was deorbited. The deorbit burn occurred at 21:39:00 UTC, with the mission ending at 22:26 UTC.

See also

 1998 in spaceflight
 List of Progress missions
 List of uncrewed spaceflights to Mir

References

Progress (spacecraft) missions
1998 in Kazakhstan
Spacecraft launched in 1998
Spacecraft which reentered in 1998
Spacecraft launched by Soyuz-U rockets